Harasis is the Hinawi bedouin tribe of Oman. They arrived in the Jiddat al-Harasis desert of Dhofar Governorate in the late 19th century. Harasis people (about 1000-2000 people in the Jiddat al-Harasis are reported to be of different identity compared to the Bedu nomads. They speak the Harsusi language; though they are reported to be increasing their use of the Mehri language, which is more dominant in the area, and are bilingual in Arabic.

References

Bibliography

Bedouin groups
Ethnic groups in Oman